Douglas Gordon Doug Wilson (28 January 1920 – 18 October 2010) was a British athlete who competed at the 1948 Summer Olympics. In London he competed in the men's 1500m event, but was eliminated in the opening round, placing fifth in his heat. He was born in Islington and was a member of the Polytechnic Harriers of London. In 2008 he was interviewed by the BBC on the subject of the 2012 Summer Olympics that are to be held in London, where he suggested that the organizing committee "should go back to basics, the simplicity of the games". He died in Winchester, Hampshire, England in October 2010.

References

1920 births
2010 deaths
Athletes (track and field) at the 1948 Summer Olympics
British male middle-distance runners
Olympic athletes of Great Britain